"She Will Have Her Way" is a song by New Zealand singer-songwriter and Crowded House lead singer Neil Finn. Released on 1 June 1998, the track peaked at number 19 on the New Zealand Singles Chart and number 26 on the UK Singles Chart. The song gave its name to the 2005 tribute album She Will Have Her Way, which features female Australasian artists performing tracks written by Neil and Tim Finn. It was also the inspiration for the title of the 2010 tribute album He Will Have His Way.

Music video
The black and white music video for this song features a giantess capturing, carrying off and eventually marrying Neil Finn. It is a spoof of the 1958 B-movie Attack of the 50 Foot Woman and the 1959 Lou Costello comedy The 30 Foot Bride of Candy Rock. The video includes clips from both films.

Track listings

Australian CD single
 "She Will Have Her Way"
 "Tokyo"
 "She Comes Scattered"
 "Sinner" (Abbey Rd version)

UK CD1
 "She Will Have Her Way"
 "Astro"
 "808 Song"

UK CD2
 "She Will Have Her Way"
 "Faster Than Light"
 "Identical Twin"

UK cassette single and European CD single
 "She Will Have Her Way"
 "Astro"

Charts

Release history

References

Neil Finn songs
1998 singles
1998 songs
Music videos directed by Jonathan Dayton and Valerie Faris
Parlophone singles
Song recordings produced by Marius de Vries
Song recordings produced by Tchad Blake
Songs written by Neil Finn